James B. Burns (September 21, 1945 – December 11, 2020) was an American lawyer who served as the inspector general for the Illinois Secretary of State. He was also a professional basketball player in the National Basketball Association (NBA) and American Basketball Association (ABA).

A native of McLeansboro, Illinois, Burns was an all-state player who led McLeansboro High School to a fourth-place finish in the 1962 State Championship Tournament. He then played collegiately for Northwestern University, 1964–67, where he led the team in scoring all three seasons, was  both All-American and Academic All-American in 1967, was All-Big Ten and Academic All-Big Ten in 1966 and '67, and is still Northwestern's  12th all-time scorer, 3rd in scoring average, 10th in both field goals and free throws made, and 6th in points in a game (40). He was inducted into the Northwestern Athletics Hall of Fame in 1992.

He was selected by the Chicago Bulls in the fourth round (34th pick overall) of the 1967 NBA Draft. He played only three games with the Bulls during the 1967–68 season where he teamed with fellow McLeansboro native Jerry Sloan. Burns also played for the Dallas Chaparrals (1967–68) in the ABA for 33 games.

Following his short professional basketball career, Burns returned to Northwestern, earning his law degree. While in private practice, he was also active in Democratic politics, running unsuccessfully for Lieutenant Governor of Illinois in 1990. In 1992, he was appointed the U.S. attorney for the Northern District of Illinois. He replaced Fred Foreman in the position. His investigations of and prosecutions for political corruption gained him public recognition and popularity. It has also been claimed that those same things antagonized many powerful Democrats, so that his 1998 campaign for governor was not strongly supported.  Despite his popularity and the Republicans' admission that he was the candidate they most feared, Burns finished a distant fourth of six candidates.

In April 2000, Illinois Secretary of State Jesse White appointed Burns as his inspector general, a position he held until his death. Burns died on December 11, 2020, at the age of 75.

References

External links

1945 births
2020 deaths
20th-century American lawyers
21st-century American lawyers
All-American college men's basketball players
American men's basketball players
Basketball players from Illinois
Candidates in the 1992 United States elections
Candidates in the 1998 United States elections
Chicago Bulls draft picks
Chicago Bulls players
Dallas Chaparrals players
Illinois Democrats
Illinois lawyers
People from McLeansboro, Illinois
Northwestern Wildcats men's basketball players
Northwestern University Pritzker School of Law alumni
Shooting guards
United States Attorneys for the Northern District of Illinois